Douglas Ellington House is a historic home located at Asheville, Buncombe County, North Carolina. It was built in 1926 by architect Douglas Ellington, and is an eclectic stone and brick cottage set into its terraced, hillside site.  It consists of a two-bay, -story brick "cottage" under a broad-eaved, wood shingled hip roof; a five-bay, uncoursed stone central block; and a traditional, single-room log cabin, said to have been on the property when Ellington's brother, Kenneth Ellington, bought it. They thought it to be over 100 years old.

It was listed on the National Register of Historic Places in 1986.

Gallery

References

External links

Houses on the National Register of Historic Places in North Carolina
Houses completed in 1926
Houses in Asheville, North Carolina
National Register of Historic Places in Buncombe County, North Carolina